Lobophora is a genus of thalloid brown seaweed of the Phylum Ochrophyta; Class Phaeophyceae.

Taxonomy and nomenclature
The genus Lobophora belongs to the Order Dictyotales; Family Dictyotaceae, and additionally to the Tribe of Zonarieae.

Currently, there are a total of seventy-one (71) taxonomically accepted species belonging to this genus:

 Lobophora abaculusa C.W.Vieira, Payri & De Clerck
 Lobophora abscondita C.W.Vieira, Payri & De Clerck
 Lobophora adpressa O.Camacho & C.Fernández-García
 Lobophora africana C.W.Vieira & M.Zubia
 Lobophora agardhii Payri & C.W.Vieira
 Lobophora antsirananaensis Viera & Rasoamanendrika
 Lobophora asiatica Z.Sun, Ji.Tanaka & H.Kawai
 Lobophora astrolabeae C.W.Vieira & Payri
 Lobophora bandeirae C.W.Vieira, DeClerk & F.Leliaert
 Lobophora boudeuseae C.W.Vieira & Payri
 Lobophora boussoleae C.W.Vieira & Payri
 Lobophora brooksii D.L.Ballantine & J.N.Norris
 Lobophora caboverdeana C.W.Vieira & C.H.Almada
 Lobophora canariensis (Sauvageau) C.W.Vieira, De Clerck & Payri
 Lobophora ceylanica (Harvey ex E.S.Barton) C.W.Vieira, De Clerck & Payri
 Lobophora challengeriae C.W.Vieira
 Lobophora colombiana O.Comacho & Fredericq
 Lobophora coquilleae C.W.Vieira
 Lobophora crispata O.Camacho & Fredericq
 Lobophora dagamae C.W.Viera
 Lobophora delicata Camacho & Fredericq
 Lobophora dichotoma (R.H.Simons) P.C.Silva
 Lobophora dickiei Payri & C.W.Vieira
 Lobophora dimorpha C.W.Vieira, Payri & De Clerck
 Lobophora dispersa Camacho, Freshwater & Fredericq
 Lobophora endeavouriae C.W.Vieira
 Lobophora erythraea C.W.Vieira
 Lobophora esperanceae C.W.Vieira
 Lobophora etoileae C.W.Vieira
 Lobophora evanii C.W.Vieira & Rasoamanendrika
 Lobophora flabellata C.W.Vieira, De Clerck, R.J.Anderson & J.J.Bolton
 Lobophora garyi C.W.Vieira & Rasoamanendrika
 Lobophora gibbera C.W.Vieira, Payri & De Clerck
 Lobophora gloriosa C.W.Vieira & M.Zubia
 Lobophora hederacea C.W.Vieira, Payri & De Clerck
 Lobophora henae C.W.Vieira & Rasoamanendrika
 Lobophora indica V.Krishnamurthy & M.Baluswami
 Lobophora variegata var. indica Umamaheswara Rao
 Lobophora isselii (Piccone & Grunow) C.W.Vieira, De Clerck & Payri
 Lobophora kimiae C.W.Vieira & Rasoamanendrika
 Lobophora lamourouxii Payri & C.W.Vieira
 Lobophora lessepsiana C.W.Vieira
 Lobophora lubaoreniana Luan Rixiao & Ding Lanping
 Lobophora madagascariensis C.W.Vieira & Rasoamanendrika
 Lobophora maldivensis C.W.Vieira & C.Payri
 Lobophora minima V.Krishnamurthy & M.Baluswami
 Lobophora variegata var. minima Umamaheswara Rao
 Lobophora monticola C.W.Vieira, Payri & De Clerck
 Lobophora nigrescens J.Agardh
 Lobophora novae C.W.Vieira & M.Zubia
 Lobophora obscura (Dickie) C.W.Vieira, De Clerck & Payri
 Lobophora pachyventera Z.Sun, P.-E.Lim, Ji.Tanaka & H.Kawai
 Lobophora pacifica (Setchell) C.W.Vieira, De Clerck & Payri
 Lobophora panamensis O.Camacho, C.Fernández-García & Fredericq
 Lobophora papenfussii (W.R.Taylor) Farghaly
 Lobophora petila C.W.Vieira, Payri & De Clerck
 Lobophora providenceae C.W.Vieira
 Lobophora rechercheae C.W.Vieira
 Lobophora richardii C.W.Vieira & Payri
 Lobophora rickeri Kraft
 Lobophora rosacea C.W.Vieira, Payri & De Clerck
 Lobophora schneideri C.W.Vieira
 Lobophora setchellii C.W.Vieira & Payri
 Lobophora soaresii CW.Vieira & F.A.Rasoamanendrika
 Lobophora sonderi C.W.Vieira, De Clerck & Payri
 Lobophora tortugensis O.Camancho & Fredericq
 Lobophora tsengii D.Tien & Z.Sun
 Lobophora undulata C.W.Vieira, Payri & De Clerck
 Lobophora variegata (J.V.Lamouroux) Womersley ex E.C.Oliveira
 Lobophora zmaragdina C.W.Vieira & C.Payri

General morphological characteristics

Thalli 
Thalli are foliose or fan-shaped and possess different growth morphologies: decumbent, procumbent, crustose, conk-like (shelf-like), fasciculate, and stipitate, depending on species and habitat. Thalli arises from matted rhizoidal holdfast with branched fronds displaying broadly flabellate to irregularly branched forms. Algal hairs are arranged in concentric lines or scattered turf. Size can reach up to 20 cm long. Coloration are commonly light brown to dark-brown.

Cellular structure (internal morphology) 
Thalli is 7-12 cells thick, with the outermost layers composed of cortical cells overlying innermost layer of larger medullary cells. Medullary cells usually exhibit uniform sized except for the larger central cells. Discoid chloroplasts are found at the cortical layers.

Reproductive structures 
The sporangial sori of Lobophora are either scattered or in concentric bands found at the surface of the thallus They are characteristically indusiated but without paraphyses. Sporangia without without a basal stalk cell produces up to eight (8) spores. Oogonia are found in sori on both side of the frond surfaces.

Life history 
The life history of Lobophora is currently unknown. But it may have similar stages with other members from Dictyotaceae Family.

Distribution and habitat 
The genus Lobophora are found throughout the pantropical and even temperate regions. They are found growing on solid substrate (rocks) at intertidal (some are wave-exposed) to subtidal areas of rocky-reef habitats.

Ecology and impacts 
Seaweeds, such as Lobophora are naturally occurring in coral reefs. Under normal conditions, the interactions between Genus Lobophora and corals pose no threat and can co-exist in an ecosystem. This is attributed to the control of algal populations by coral chemical defense and herbivory. However, when these contributing control factors become unbalanced, Lobophora and other associated seaweeds become opportunistic in taking over reefs (i.e. increasing spatial cover) and by density-dependent negative feedback, prevents corals from settling on substrate. However, as mentioned earlier, Lobophora a species-rich group and certain individuals have different growth patterns, interactions, and habitat-preferences. Understanding and determining its taxa is utmost important.

Because of capacity of seaweeds, such as Lobophora to occupy large spatial habitats, particularly in degraded reefs, they can have an impact on the chances of coral larvae to settle on a substrate. Lobophora can inhibit coral settlement, however, its effect can decrease later on life history stages because they have no effect on growing coral nubbins. Chances of coral larvae to settle in degraded reef followed by disturbance may be challenging.

As mentioned, Lobophora are highly preferred by herbivores particularly fish. Growth morphological defenses have been developed by this group to become unpalatable to its herbivores. Encrust (crustose) forming Lobophora, such as L. variegata are dominant in areas with high concentration of herbivorous fish and sea urchin, compare to other seaweeds having a foliose or decumbent morphologies. This indicates that high herbivory activities in the area may influence the defense mechanisms of seaweeds, in the case of Lobophora, its specific growth morphologies.

Varying metabolomic concentration differs from Lobophora species when exposed to changing natural habitats and substrates. Fatty acids derivatives and polyolefins were identified as chemomarkers of these changing conditions. This indicates possible chemical plasticity of metabolites in the genus. Different Lobophora may composed varying natural products depending on bioregion.

Economic importance/ natural products 
Similar to other seaweeds, Genus Lobophora has a variety of natural products. There are: Minerals: cadmium (Cd), copper (Cu), mercury (Hg), iodine (I), nickel (Ni), lead (Pb), and zinc (Zn); Pigments: carotene, chlorophyll a, chlorophyll c, fucoxanthin; Polysaccharides/ simple sugars: alginic acid, laminarin; Sugar alcohol: mannitol.

In addition Lobophora may have contributions in medicinal application. Sulfated polysaccharides, fucans, from algae Lobophora variegata were shown to have anti-inflammatory activity in acute  zymosan-induced arthritis in laboratory rats. It resulted in treatments by reducing cell infiltration in the synovial membrane with a decrease in TNF-α. It was also shown that heterofucans are strong antioxidants. Another is Lobophora has antiprotozoal activity against parasitic protozoans such as Giardia intestinalis, Entamoeba histolytica and Trichomonas vaginalis. Extract from L. variegata shows promising result in the treatments of protozoan infection. The chloroform fraction of the extract contained a major sulfoquinovosyldiacylglycerol (SQDG), identified as 1-O-palmitoyl-2-O-myristoyl-3-O-(6´´´-sulfo-a-D-quinovopyranosyl)-glycerol, together with small amounts of 1,2-di-O-palmitoyl-3-O-(6´´´-sulfo-a-D-quinovopyranosyl)-glycerol, and a new compound identified as 1-O-palmitoyl-2-O-oleoyl-3-O-(6´´´-sulfo-a-D-quinovopyranosyl)-glycerol were identified having strong antiprotozoal attributes.

References 

Dictyotaceae
Brown algae genera